Yoel Hernández (born 12 December 1977 in Manacas, Villa Clara) is a Cuban track and field athlete who specialises in the 110 metres hurdles.

His personal best time is 13.24 seconds, achieved when he won the silver medal at the 1999 Pan American Games. The result places him fifth among Cuban 110 m hurdlers, behind Anier García, Dayron Robles, Emilio Valle and Alejandro Casañas.

Achievements

References

External links

Sports reference biography
Tilastopaja biography
Picture of Yoel Hernández

1977 births
Living people
People from Santo Domingo, Cuba
Cuban male hurdlers
Olympic male hurdlers
Olympic athletes of Cuba
Athletes (track and field) at the 2000 Summer Olympics
Athletes (track and field) at the 2004 Summer Olympics
Pan American Games medalists in athletics (track and field)
Pan American Games silver medalists for Cuba
Pan American Games bronze medalists for Cuba
Athletes (track and field) at the 1999 Pan American Games
Athletes (track and field) at the 2007 Pan American Games
World Athletics Championships athletes for Cuba
Medalists at the 1999 Pan American Games
Medalists at the 2007 Pan American Games
Central American and Caribbean Games medalists in athletics
Central American and Caribbean Games bronze medalists for Cuba
Competitors at the 2006 Central American and Caribbean Games
21st-century Cuban people